My First Love is a 2018 fantasy South Korean television series starring Lee Jung-shin, Seo Ji-hoon and Lee Yul-eum. It is based on the webtoon by the same title, released in 2015. It aired on OCN's Mondays and Tuesdays at 21:00 (KST) time slot from January 8 to February 6, 2018 for ten episodes.

Synopsis
The story of a man who cannot forget his first love from ten years ago and is given the chance to redo history as he returns to the past.

Cast

Main
 Lee Jung-shin as Kang Shin-woo (28 years old), a high school mathematics teacher who, by an accidental opportunity, returns to ten years in the past and meets his younger self.
 Seo Ji-hoon as young Kang Shin-woo (18 years old)
 Lee Yul-eum as Han Ji-soo, Shin-woo's first love, a pretty and smart student who hides an inner pain from childhood.

Supporting
 Kim Sun-young as Shin-woo's mother
 Cho Seung-hee as Baek Na-hee
 Park Han-sol as Kim Yun-jeong
 Kim Min-seok as Kim Min-seok
 Min Do-hee as Jang So-ra
 Lee Joo-hyung as Joo Geun-deok
 Song Ji-hyun as Kang Shin-hee
 Lee Sang as Ki-wan
 Go Gyu-pil
 Lee Tae-sun as Shin Joo-hwan

Production
 The series marks the three main actors' first-ever lead role.
 It was initially planned by SBS Plus, the production company of the series, to air My First Love on their network, but later moved to OCN. There was also a plan to stream it first on the Oksusu app before the broadcast.
 The first script reading of the cast took place at SBS Prism Tower in Sangam-dong.
 It was fully pre-produced: filming started in late August 2017 and wrapped up on October 25.

Ratings

References

External links
  
 
 

OCN television dramas
Korean-language television shows
2018 South Korean television series debuts
2018 South Korean television series endings
South Korean fantasy television series
South Korean romantic comedy television series
South Korean time travel television series
South Korean pre-produced television series
Television shows based on South Korean webtoons